The Little Joe 6 was a launch escape system test of the Mercury spacecraft, conducted as part of the U.S. Mercury program. The mission used a boilerplate Mercury spacecraft. The mission was launched October 4, 1959, from Wallops Island, Virginia. The mission lasted 5 minutes 10 seconds. Payload .

See also
 Little Joe
 Boilerplate (spaceflight)

Project Mercury
1959 in spaceflight